Palasa is a town in Srikakulam district of the Indian state of Andhra Pradesh. It is a municipality and the mandal headquarters of Palasa mandal. It is located near to the National Highway 16 between Srikakulam and Berhampur. Along with its twin town Kasibugga.

Geography 
Palasa is located at 18.46N 84.25E. It has an average elevation of 38 meters (127 feet).

Demographics 
 census of India, Palasa had a population of 57,507 with 25,000 households.  5,609 children are in the age group of 0–6 years, of which 2,887 are boys and 2,722 are girls —a ratio of 943 girls per 1000 boys. The average literacy rate stands at 75.68% with 39,276 literates, significantly higher than the state average of 67.41%.

Government and politics 

Palasa Municipality is a civic body constituted in the year 2000. Palasa (Assembly constituency) in Andhra Pradesh Legislative Assembly.in Palasa (Assembly constituency) Palasa, Mandasa and Vajrapu Kotturu mandals comes under this jurisdiction.

Economy 
There are more than 350 cashew processing industries around Palasa, the highest amongst the northern coastal districts. These twin cities are the largest cashew producing towns of Andhra Pradesh and are among the largest processing centres in India. The cashew industry provides direct and indirect employment to about 15,000 people in the surrounding areas.

Healthcare 
The Community Health Centre, Andhra Pradesh Vaidya Vidhana Parishad is located here. It can hold 50 inpatients.

Transport

Roadways 

National Highway 16, a part of Golden Quadrilateral highway network, bypasses the town.

Education 
The primary and secondary school education is imparted by government, aided and private schools, under the School Education Department of the state. The medium of instruction followed by different schools are English and Telugu.

References

External links 

Cities and towns in Srikakulam district
Mandal headquarters in Srikakulam district
Urban local bodies in Andhra Pradesh